

Metropolitan boroughs
All 36 English Metropolitan borough councils had one third of their seats up for election.

Metropolitan boroughs